The 2018 Oregon gubernatorial election was held on November 6, 2018 to elect the Governor of Oregon to serve a full four-year term. In the 2016 special election, Democratic Governor Kate Brown had been elected to serve the last two years of John Kitzhaber's term. 

The Republican Party nominated Knute Buehler, her opponent in the 2012 Oregon Secretary of State election; the Independent Party of Oregon nominated Patrick Starnes. Brown, running for a full term, won the election; because of term limits, she became ineligible to seek the governorship again.

Democratic primary

Candidates

Declared
 Kate Brown, incumbent Governor
 Ed Jones
 Candace Neville

Endorsements

Results

Republican primary

Candidates

Declared
 Keenan Bohach
 Knute Buehler, Orthopedic Surgeon, state representative and nominee for secretary of state in 2012
 Sam Carpenter, businessman and candidate for the U.S. Senate in 2014 and 2016
 Jonathan Edwards III
 Brett Hyland
 Jeff Smith, small business owner
 David Stauffer
 Jack Tracy
 Greg Wooldridge, former Blue Angels commanding officer

Withdrew
 Bruce Cuff, real estate broker and candidate for governor in 2014 and 2016 (endorsed Greg Wooldridge)

Declined
 Lori Chavez-DeRemer, Mayor of Happy Valley and nominee for the state house in 2016
 Cedric Ross Hayden, state representative
 Mike McLane, House Minority Leader
 Bud Pierce, physician and nominee for governor in 2016
 Bill Post, state representative
 Dennis Richardson, Oregon Secretary of State, former state representative and nominee for governor in 2014

Endorsements

Debates

Polling

Results

Independent Party primary

Candidates

Declared
 Skye Allen
 Dan Pistoresi
 Patrick Starnes

Results

General election

Debates 
Complete video of debate, October 2, 2018
Third party debate, featuring Nick Chen (L), Patrick Starnes (I), and Chris Henry (P), hosted by former Green Party candidate Alex DiBlasi, October 6, 2018
Complete video of debate, October 9, 2018

Predictions

Polling

Aggregate polls

with Sam Carpenter

with Greg Wooldridge

with Lori Chavez-DeRemer

Results

Statewide results

Results by congressional district
Brown carried two out of the state's five congressional districts, losing two swing districts that simultaneously voted for Democrats in the US House, with  held by veteran congressman Peter DeFazio and  held by former veterinarian Kurt Schrader.

County results

Notes

References

External links
Candidates at Vote Smart
Candidates at Ballotpedia

Official campaign websites
Aaron Auer (C) for Governor
Kate Brown (D) for Governor
Knute Buehler (R) for Governor
Alex DiBlasi (G) for Governor
Patrick Starnes (I) for Governor
Nick Chen (L) for Governor

2018 Oregon elections
2018
Oregon